Serenades Records is a German record label based in Schwäbisch Gmünd, Stuttgart,  focused on doom metal and gothic metal. Is owned by Last Episode Records.

Signed bands  
Betray My Secrets	
Casket	
Cryptic Carnage
Cemetery of Scream	
Darkseed	
 Dies Irae
Dystrophy	
Grave Flowers	
Graveworm	
Haggard	
Jack Frost	
Penumbra	
Sacriversum	
Shade	
Soulsearch
The Bloodline

References

External links 
Metallum Archvies
Discogs.com

German record labels
Companies based in Stuttgart
Companies established in 1984